Lagos (literally "lakes") is a city and municipality at the mouth of Bensafrim River and along the Atlantic Ocean, in the Barlavento region of the Algarve, in southern Portugal. The population of the municipality in 2011 was 31,049, in an area of 212.99 km2. The city of Lagos proper (which includes only the civil parish of São Sebastião e Santa Maria) has a population of approximately 22,000. Typically, these numbers increase during the summer months, with the influx of visiting tourists and seasonal residents. While the majority of the population lives along the coast and works in tourism and services, the inland region is sparsely inhabited, with the majority of the people working in agriculture and forestry.

Lagos is one of the most visited cities in the Algarve and Portugal, due to its variety of tourist-friendly beaches, rock formations (Ponta da Piedade), bars, restaurants and hotels, renowned for its vibrant summer nightlife and parties. Yet, Lagos is also a historic centre of the Portuguese Age of Discovery, frequent home of Henry the Navigator, historical shipyard and, at one time, centre of the European slave trade. In 2012, travel website TripAdvisor, classified Lagos as the number one travel destination, on a list of "15 destinations on the rise" worldwide.

Lagos, Nigeria, may have been named after it, since, at the time of the 15th century, Lagos, Portugal, was the main centre of Portuguese maritime expeditions down the African coast.

History

Lagos is an ancient maritime town with more than 2000 years of history. The name Lagos comes from a Celtic settlement, derived from the Latin Lacobriga, the name of the settlement was established during the pre-Punic civilizations. It became an early settlement of the Carthaginians, who recruited Celtic tribesmen in their war against the Romans (the Punic Wars). Owing to its already important harbour, it was colonized by the Romans and integrated into the Roman province of Lusitania, becoming known as Lacobriga. Quintus Sertorius, a rebellious Roman general, helped by the Lusitanians of Lacobriga (who had been oppressed under Roman Generals and members of Lucius Cornelius Sulla party), successfully defeated the Roman army of Caecilius Metellus Pius probably at nearby Monte Molião.

With the fall of Rome, the town of Lagos was occupied in the sixth century by the Visigoths from the Kingdom of Toledo and later by the Byzantines.
The Moors arrived in the 8th century from North Africa, renaming the settlement Zawaia (meaning lago, or lake).  It became part of the much larger coastal region of al-Gharb, which eventually became known as the Algarve. The Moors fortified the town  with Lagos Castle and established important trade links to Northern Africa from their bases in the Iberian peninsula. In 1174, the local Wāli gave permission for the Christian peoples to construct a church dedicated to São João Baptista, which was built outside the town's walls (becoming the oldest church in the Algarve).

Kingdom
Even as King Afonso Henriques advanced to the south, the Christian Reconquista never made it into Algarve and Alentejo, and the south remained under Moorish control. King Sancho I, with the support of Crusader forces used Lagos as a stepping stone to attack the fortress of Alvôr. Zawaia was eventually captured by King Afonso III of Portugal in 1241, but was only taken definitively in 1249. From this period on the King began self-styling himself as the "King of Portugal and the Algarve", stressing the fact that the Algarve (which had for so long been ruled by the Moors as a foreign country) had been annexed into the dominion of the Portuguese.
Lagos became an independent jurisdiction under the rule of King Peter I in 1361.

King John I assembled his fleet in the harbour of Lagos, before setting sail for the siege and conquest of the city of Ceuta in 1415. This was the first step in opening the Muslim world to medieval Europe, which in fact led to the Age of Discovery with Portuguese explorers sailing across the whole world. By the 15th century, Lagos became the centre of Portuguese maritime exploration, with ships ordered south to trace the shoreline of Africa in order to find routes to India. Infante Henry the Navigator, third son of King John, lived most of the time in Lagos. From here he directed expeditions to Morocco and to the western coast of Africa with caravels, lateen-rigged ships with excellent seafaring capabilities. Lagos was also the home port for Gil Eanes who was the first to sail beyond Cape Bojador in 1434, after a failed attempt in 1433 that put him out of favour with the, then considered the end of the world. The act of rounding the Cape, much like the later rounding of the Cape of Good Hope, permitted Eanes (and the navigators that followed) to advance into the African subcontinent. When, by 1443, Lançarote (then fiscal officer of the crown) had sailed as far as Arguim and brought back 275 Africans, the Portuguese had sufficient slaves to relieve the perpetual handicap of agricultural labour.

Over the following decades, news of discoveries and achievements, and ships loaded with spices and goods would flow into the port of Lagos.  It was also the gateway for the first African slaves into post-medieval Europe. Even before Africa was opened-up to the Portuguese, the seamen of Lagos were already unscrupulous slave traders. From the first slave markets in Lagos (the Mercado de Escravos, which opened in 1444), many Africans were dispersed throughout Europe, bringing a considerable income to the Portuguese monarchy and merchant classes, as well as cheap labour force. As the major sponsor of these expeditions, Prince Henry received one-fifth of the selling price of every slave. The demand for the indentured labour force was so high that, by 1450, profit on Mauritanian slaves was 700 percent.  The discovery of gold by Alfonso Gonçales also increased activities in Lagos, whose residents petitioned the Infante Henry to establish a trading company to pursue gold deposits in the region. This included Juan Dias (ancestor of Bartolomeu Dias who rounded the Cape of Good Hope), Gil Eanes, Lançarote de Freitas, Estevan Alfonso and Rodrigo Alvarez, who provisioned a squadron of six caravels to travel to isle of Garças in 1444, but returned with 150 Africans.

Following the death of Prince Henry, and the expansion into the Atlantic and New World, the port of Lagos continued to receive shipments of goods and slaves, but its role began to decrease. Lisbon began to prosper, with ships returning directly from the colonies of the Azores, Madeira and Brazil, while trading houses began to relocate to the capital. But, even as the wealth arrived in Lisbon and Lagos, the ostentation was widely on display in the royal residences.

King Sebastian, obsessed with his plans for a great crusade against the Kingdom of Fez, assembled a huge fleet in Lagos in 1578. During this ill-fated attempt he and most of Portugal's nobility were killed in the Battle of Ksar El Kebir in Morocco, eventually causing a succession crisis, that eventually resulted in the Iberian Union.

When Portugal came under Spanish rule, the Portuguese coast became a target for the English fleet.  Lagos, close to the Spanish naval base of Cádiz, was attacked by Sir Francis Drake in the late 1580s, but was defended by its inhabitants, resulting in Drakes sack of Faro. But, the coast was under regular attack of other pirates and corsairs, in addition to the Spanish who bombarded the Algarve during the Portuguese Restoration War (1640–1668), which led to the construction of a string of forts all along the coast. One of them was the late-17th-century Fort of Ponta da Bandeira in Lagos, which was completed between 1679 and 1690 (according to the stone inscription over the main door).

From 1576 to 1755, Lagos was a high-profile capital of the Algarve, until the old Portuguese town was destroyed by the earthquake and tsunami of 1755. Although some walls from the 16th century still remain, as well as the governor's castle, many of the buildings are from the 17th century.

Two well-known naval battles took place off Lagos, reflecting its strategic location: in the Battle of Lagos (1693) a French flotilla defeated a combined Anglo-Dutch force, while in the Battle of Lagos (1759) a British force defeated a French force.

Geography

Physical geography
By its geographical position (east-northeast to west-southwest orientation) and lithological diversity, the Algarve stands out as a unique stratigraphic and morpho-tectonic region. A peripheral Carboniferous unit of the Variscan orogeny, it constitutes the Mesozoic and Cenozoic sedimentary layers, deposited onto two totally distinct superimposed basins. Between the Middle-Upper Triassic to Hettangian, sediments evolved from continental (fluvial red sandstone) to shallow marine over the entire region, which included instances of evaporates, tholeiite fissural magmas, lava flows, volcanic ash and pyroclasts.

The area of Lagos, conforms to the Middle Miocene Lagos-Portimão formation (a band that extends along the coast from Lagos to Albufeira, abutting the Serra do Caldeirão to the north) and which corresponds to marine sedimentation over relatively stable, but a minorly deformed limestone shelf platform. A period of calm during the intra-Miocene (of approximately 2.4 Ma) led to generalized exposure and development of karst, that influences the present day coastline. The conspicuous horizontal bending of this profile in the cliffs of Lagos, much like the remainder of the Lagos-Portimão formation, is formed by alternating bands of siliciclastic and calcareous lithologies. The low degree of cementation in the layers causes a high degree of instability of the cliffs. The littoral and cliff sands are dominated by various bivalve organisms, bryozoans, larger benthic foraminifers and Coralline algae with minor additions of echinoids and balanids implying a shallow-water depositional system of a warm-temperate climatic regime. The locality of Cerro das Mós, from where a large crocodilian (Tomistoma schlegelii) tooth was collected long ago, has also produced some Odontoceti teeth. These may be dated from the Serravallian, which, constitute the oldest marine mammal occurrence in the Algarve.

Climate
Lagos has a Mediterranean climate (Köppen: Csa) with hot, dry summers and mild, wet winters. Like the rest of the Algarve, Lagos is very sunny, averaging over 3100 hours of sunshine a year. Summers are warm to hot, very sunny and generally still, the coastal sea breeze helps to cool down the often excessive heat of this season.

Ecoregions/Protected areas
Lagos has many natural interest sites, including:
 Ponta da Piedade
 Grutas da Costa d'Oiro
 Laguna de Alvor
"Bravura Dam" )
 Mata Nacional de Barão de S.João, representing a varied flora that includes Pine (Pinaceae), Acacia (Acacia), Eucalyptus (Eucalyptus) and Strawberry trees (Arbutus unedo), with six pedestrian trails and six campsites. In the zone of Pedra Branca, is a Paleolithic menhir, called the Menhir of Pedro do Galo, accessible through the pedestrian trails, visitors can use the tables and picnicking areas near the guardhouse for barbecues, while small children have access to a playground. A public sports field and 100 metre interval obstacle course was also constructed to attract activity, near the picnic area.

Beaches

 Meia Praia (Half Beach) —the most popular tourist beach, consisting of soft, white sand, Meia Praia is one of the largest open bays in Europe, resulting in calm seas, permitting conditions for many nautical sports, while cliffs provide sheltered coves from strong windy conditions;
 Praia Solaria (Sunny Beach);
 Praia da Batata (Potato Beach) — a small beach tucked between two small cliffs (where the river meets the Atlantic Ocean).  It is known for the small music festivals that take place there during summer;
 Praia dos Estudantes (Students' Beach);
 Praia da Dona Ana (Dona Ana Beach) - its areal is slightly thicker than the beaches in the surrounding area and it is surrounded by striking rock formations. At high tide the beach is split by the geomorphology of the cliffs;
 Praia do Canavial (Canavial Beach);
 Praia de Camilo (Camilo Beach);
 Praia da Luz (Beach of Light) - located in the parish of Luz, the beach is bounded in the east by Rocha Negra, providing summer vacationers with a popular escape.
 Praia da Balança- located after Praia da Boneca and Praia dos Pinheiros, it is a sandy cove enclosed by towering cliffs.

Sustainable tourism
In 2012 Lagos received the QualityCoast Gold Award for its efforts to become a sustainable tourism destination. Because of this award, Lagos has been selected for inclusion in the global atlas for sustainable tourism DestiNet.

Human geography
It is surrounded along its borders by the municipalities of Vila do Bispo (to the west), Aljezur (to the northwest), Monchique (to the northeast) and  Portimão (to the east).

To the north of Lagos is the road to Silves, the first capital of the Algarve, Monchique (spa town/mountain), Milfontes, a coastal town and port/harbour of the city of Sines, that winds through the scenic protected landscape of the Southwest Natural Park (Costa Sudoeste Alentejana e Vicentina).

Administratively, the municipality is divided into four civil parishes (freguesias):
 Bensafrim e Barão de São João
 Lagos (São Sebastião e Santa Maria)
 Luz, which includes the separate villages of Almádena and Espiche.
 Odiáxere

Twin towns — Sister cities 

Lagos is twinned with:
 Torres Vedras, district of Lisbon, Portugal
 Ribeira Grande, island of São Miguel, Azores
 Ribeira Grande de Santiago, island of Santiago, Cape Verde
 Palos de la Frontera, autonomous community of Andalusia, Spain
 Ksar El Kebir, city in the province of Larache, Morocco
 Sassenheim, town in the province of South Holland, Netherlands

Economy

Lagos' economy, like many coastal towns in Portugal, has always been closely linked to the sea, and fishing has been an important activity since very ancient times. Since 1960, the city has embraced tourism, which has become its most important economic activity. It has beautiful beaches, good climate, the sea, a scenic coastline, and historical patrimony.

The Marina de Lagos has 460 berths and has become an important centre for long-distance cruisers, and it is also known for its modern drawbridge.

Lagos also has numerous cultural and night-life entertainment venues.

Transportation

Lagos Station is the western terminus of the Linha do Algarve railway line, which connects Lagos to Vila Real de Santo António (via Faro and Tavira). The passenger train service is operated by Comboios de Portugal (CP). Connections are available at Tunes for trains to Lisbon and Porto.

The municipal aerodrome handles only small recreational planes; the nearest airport is Faro.

Architecture

Prehistoric
 Menir da Cabeça do Rochedo

Civic
 Barracks of the Guarda Fiscal of Lagos
 Building of the Caixa Geral de Depósitos
 Building of the Correios, Telégrafos e Telefonos
 Building of the Portagem
 District Courthouse/Palace of Justice
 District Jailhouse of Lagos/Cultural Centre of Lagos
 D. Maria Bridge
 Fonte Coberta Dam
 Gil Eanes Secondary/Commercial-Industrial School
 Hotel Tivolli Lagos
 Municipal Hall of Lagos
 Lighthouse of Ponta da Piedade
 Pillory of Lagos
 Regional Museum of Lagos - this modest regional museum is located next to the church of Santo António., housing the eclectic collection of archaeological finds from prehistory and the Neolithic, in addition to minerals, Roman mosaics, Moorish oil-lamps and pottery.  The ethnographic section includes exhibits from life in the Algarve, that includes not only residential, but also military artefacts, such as swords, muskets and cannonballs, and the foral (charter) issued by King Manuel for Lagos. Religious artefacts are also prominent in the displays, that include the sacerdotal vestments worn by the canons who said Holy Mass to King Sebastian (before he left on his ill-fated conquest of Morocco), and a diptych (dating from the 16th century) with scenes from the Annunciation and Presentation of Jesus at the Temple.
 Slave Market/Customshoues of Lagos

Military
 Bulwark of Alcaria/Freiras
 Bulwark of Porta dos Quartos
 Bulwark of Santa Maria/Porta da Vila
 Bulwark of São Francisco/Jogo da Bola
 Castle of Senhora da Luz
 Fort of Meia Praia
 Fort of Ponta da Bandeira - also known as the Forte do Pau da Bandeira, the Forte de Nossa Senhora da Penha de França or the Forte do Registo, the fort, which guarded the entrance to the harbour, was originally dedicated to the Santa Virgem Senhora da Penha de França (to which it was referred). This squat rectangular fort guards the entrance to the harbour, accessed by a small drawbridge, to terraced spaces (that overlook the town, beach and harbour) and the small chapel (decorated with 17th-century azulejos tile). Until the late 20th century, the fort was used as a service depot for military forces and housed services linked to maritime activities (such as supplies for lifeboats and nautical sports). It was restored between 1958 and 1960, and officially acquired by the municipality of Lagos in 1983, where it was converted into exhibition displays of maritime history, with astrolabes and models of caravels.
 Fort of Pinhão
 Military Barracks of Lagos
 Musketeers' Workshop/Warehouse and Saddlery
 Regimental Warehouse/Church of São Brás
 Tower of Atalaia
 Walled/Tower Fortifications of Lagos

Religious

 Chapel/Hermitage of São João Baptista
 Church of Nossa Senhora do Carmo
 Church of Nossa Senhora da Luz
 Church of Odiáxere
 Church of Santa Maria
 Church of Santo António - its simple façade with the asymmetrical bell towers, date from 1715, and contrast sharply with the extravagantly decorated interior, which is covered in gilded wood carvings and blue-and-white 18th-century azulejo tiles (talha dourada) which fill the walls of the nave, while six Baroque paintings by José Joaquim Rasquinho, representing the miracles of Saint Anthony are hung on its walls. The wooden vault was painted with a trompe-l'œil effect, while polychrome statues of cherubs playing with animals and fishes are scattered within the interior. It was one of the few buildings to survive the Great Earthquake of 1755, reconstructed by the local commander of Regimental Infantry, who may have added the polychromatic statue of St. Anthony with military sash. Purportedly, King Sebastian attended his last mass in this church, before his ill-fated expedition to Morocco.* Convent of Nossa Senhora do Loreto
 Church of São Sebastião
 Hermitage of São Pedro de Pulgão/Nossa Senhora dos Aflitos
 Ruins of the Hermitage of Santo Amaro
 Ruins of the Convent of the Trinity

Culture
Many local traditions are celebrated in the municipality and range from gastronomy to traditional handicrafts.

In gastronomy, there are the local specialties: Dom rodrigos and morgados cookies based on local products, such as almonds, figs and eggs. Lagos is also a wine-producing region and is famous for its moscatel wine, and also for a strong alcoholic spirit,  the aguardente de medronho, made of berries of strawberry tree.

Notable citizens

 Gundisalvus of Lagos (c.1370–1422), saint of the Order of Saint Augustine
 Soeiro da Costa  (c.1390–c.1472), navigator and one of the Heroic Twelve of the Lusiadas
 Gil Eanes (1395–15thC), navigator and explorer of the 15th century
 Diogo Gomes (c.1420–c.1500), a Portuguese navigator, explorer and writer
 Pedro de Sintra (15thC), a Portuguese explorer of Sierra Leone around 1462 
 Lançarote de Freitas (15thC), navigator and slave trader in the 15th century
 Diogo Rodrigues (c.1501–1577), navigator, captain, Governor of Salsette Island
 Gaspar Jorge de Leão Pereira (?? in Lagos –1576), the first Archbishop of Goa
 Manuel Pereira de Sampaio (1692–1750), a nobleman and diplomat at the Holy See in Rome
 José Sebastião de Almeida Neto (1841–1920), a Cardinal and Patriarch of Lisbon
 Júlio Dantas (1876–1962), doctor, poet, journalist, screenwriter, politician and diplomat
 José Reis, first Portuguese geriatric physician, founder of the Portuguese Geriatric and Gerontological Society in 1951
 Júlia Barroso (1930–1996), actress, singer and teacher

Sport 
 Fernando Cabrita (1923–2014), a footballer with 351 club caps and manager
 Jamila Marreiros (b.1988), a football goalkeeper, 12 caps with Portugal women
 Diogo Viana (b.1990), a Portuguese professional footballer

See also

 Lagos DOC

References

Notes

Sources

External links

 
Populated places in Faro District
Municipalities of the Algarve
Towns of the Algarve
Seaside resorts in Portugal
Municipalities of Faro District